A Lonely Man is the fourth studio album by American soul group The Chi-Lites, produced and largely written by lead singer Eugene Record. The album was released in 1972 on the Brunswick label.

History
A Lonely Man includes The Chi-Lites most successful single "Oh Girl", which topped both the pop and R&B charts and peaked at No. 14 on the UK Singles Chart, the eight and a half-minute epic "The Coldest Days of My Life" and a cover of Marvin Gaye's "Inner City Blues (Make Me Wanna Holler)". A Lonely Man was The Chi-Lites' most successful album, topping the R&B chart and peaking at No. 5 on the pop chart. It is frequently cited as the group's best recording. AllMusic reviewer Craig Lytle describes the album as "flawless" and "exquisite".

Track listing

Personnel
Marshall Thompson – vocals
Robert "Squirrel" Lester – vocals
Creadel "Red" Jones – vocals
Eugene Record – producer, arranger, vocals
Thomas (Tom Tom) Washington – arranger, conductor
Cliff Davis – arranger
Bruce Swedien – engineer
Craig Barksdale – technician

Charts

Weekly charts

Singles

See also
List of number-one R&B albums of 1972 (U.S.)

References

External links
A Lonely Man at Discogs

1972 albums
The Chi-Lites albums
Brunswick Records albums
Albums produced by Eugene Record